Emam Hasan-e Sofla (also Romanized as Emām Ḩasan-e Soflá; also known as Emām Ḩasan, Emām Ḩassan-e Pā’īn, Imām Hasan, and Imām Hassan) is a village in Nasrabad Rural District (Kermanshah Province), in the Central District of Qasr-e Shirin County, Kermanshah Province, Iran. At the 2006 census, its population was 137, in 34 families. The village is populated by Kurds.

References 

Populated places in Qasr-e Shirin County
Kurdish settlements in Kermanshah Province